The 2020 COSAFA Cup was supposed to be the 20th edition of the an annual international association football competition organized by COSAFA.

COSAFA announced at its annual general meeting on 25 January 2020 that edition would take place in Durban, South Africa between 13 and 27 June, but cancelled it on 2 October that year due to the COVID-19 pandemic in South Africa.

References

External links
 for COSAFA

COSAFA Cup
2020 in African football
2020 in South African sport
International association football competitions hosted by South Africa
Association football events cancelled due to the COVID-19 pandemic